IMI Systems, previous Israel Military Industries, also referred to as Ta'as, was an Israeli weapons manufacturer. It manufactured weapons, munitions and military technology mainly for Israeli security forces (especially Israel's army, the Israel Defense Forces or IDF).

On 25 November 2018, Elbit Systems completed the acquisition of IMI Systems and renamed it to Elbit Systems Land.

Small arms 

Israel Weapon Industries' small arms are some of the most popular in the world. The Uzi submachine gun is arguably the most popular submachine gun in the world, because of its compact nature and reliability. Overall, the Uzi has the highest sales statistics of all modern submachine guns, worldwide.

The IMI Galil is a compact assault rifle, along with integrating some other design features. The Negev is IMI's main light machine gun. The Jericho 941 is a semi-automatic pistol, while the Tavor is a bullpup assault rifle.

In the 1980s an American firearms designer, Magnum Research, contracted IMI to re-design and manufacture a Magnum caliber (.44 Magnum, .357 Magnum and .50 AE), semi-automatic pistol. The result was the Desert Eagle, a very powerful handgun made famous by Hollywood and first-person shooters.

Other products are created, mainly for use by the IDF. The Uzi, however, is popular with many forces worldwide, while the Galil and Tavor are popular with counter-terrorist forces.

In 2005, Israel Military Industries sold its Magen division (Small Arms Division) to Israeli privately owned holding company SK Group and renamed Israel Weapon Industries.

Other products

IMI has dedicated factories manufacturing ammunition for firearms, artillery (both explosive rounds and rockets), tanks and air-to-ground (both stand-off and direct attack). Many of its products are standard NATO-compatible, but IMI also produces eastern bloc-caliber munitions. However, for the past the weapons have not been STANAG compliant.

Besides small arms, the IMI also produces heavy weapons. IMI engages in many upgrade projects for military vehicles (tanks, APCs and other armoured fighting vehicles). Upgrade components include firepower, survivability and maneuverability.

IMI also produces a wide range of defensive products such as vehicle add-on armor packages, landmine clearing systems, and reconnaissance systems and bridges. It also produces aircraft countermeasures, such as flares, decoys and electronic countermeasures control systems, some of which IMI now offers also for land- and sea-based platforms.

Products

Vehicles
Wildcat APC MRAP
COMBATGUARD armored combat vehicle

Rifles
Romat
Galil ACE
Galil 
Tavor 
Tavor X95
IWI Arad

Machine guns/pistols
Negev
Uzi

Semi-automatic pistols
Jericho 941
SP-21 Barak
IMI Desert Eagle

Missiles and launchers
MAPATS 
Delilah 
MARS
MAR-290
LAR-160
Romach
ACCULAR 
EXTRA 
Predator Hawk
MSOV

Tank guns
IMI 120 mm gun – Tank Gun

Bombs and grenades
FASTLIGHT 
MPR500
Refaim bullet-trap rifle-grenade
 Cluster bombs

Accessories
CornerShot and attachments

Armor add-ons
Armor plating coat 
Explosive reactive armour
Tractor protection kit (TPK) for Caterpillar D7
Armor kit for Caterpillar D9 bulldozer (L\N)
Iron Fist active protection system - Active protection system (APS)

Security training
IMI also provides military training to the Israeli citizens. IMI contracts its services to outside countries that need security and military training. The clients come to IMI in Israel for months of security and V.I.P. training.

Defective cluster bombs used by Georgia
IMI manufactured cluster bombs, which were sold to foreign nations including NATO countries. A study by Human Rights Watch found Israeli-manufactured cluster bombs were used by Georgia during its war with Russia. Most bombs in the run were found defective, and were dropped in at least 9 residential areas.  Pentagon sources identified to Haaretz the manufacturer as IMI.

Metropolitan College of New York
Israel Military Industries also has a partnership with the Metropolitan College of New York (MCNY) in New York City. Metropolitan College of New York offers a classroom based Master's In Public Administration in Emergency Management and Homeland Security. In addition, all students go to Israel for an intensive study abroad seminar covering Homeland Security and Anti-Terrorism topics with Israel's top security and military experts.

See also
Israel Weapon Industries
Ashot Ashkelon
Military equipment of Israel

References

External links

Israeli Weapons Industry (formerly IMI small arms division)
How a fake kibbutz was built to hide a bullet factory - Early days in IMI's history

Firearm manufacturers of Israel
Defense companies of Israel
Formerly government-owned companies of Israel